Howard Thornton Joseph (born 25 August 1949) is a former New Zealand rugby union player. A centre, Joseph represented Canterbury at a provincial level, and was a member of the New Zealand national side, the All Blacks, in 1971. He played two matches for the All Blacks, both of them tests against the touring British Lions. A journalist and lawyer, Joseph wrote a novel, Game Without End, published in 2007, about rugby in New Zealand.

He stood as the National Party candidate in the Christchurch electorate of Yaldhurst at the  general election. He was unsuccessful in winning the seat, losing to the Labour Party candidate Margaret Austin.

References

1949 births
Living people
Rugby union players from Christchurch
People educated at Christchurch Boys' High School
University of Canterbury alumni
New Zealand rugby union players
New Zealand international rugby union players
Canterbury rugby union players
Rugby union centres
21st-century New Zealand novelists
20th-century New Zealand lawyers
New Zealand journalists
New Zealand National Party politicians
Unsuccessful candidates in the 1984 New Zealand general election